Training centre for release of the Atma-energy (German: Trainingszentrum zur Freisetzung der Atmaenergie), also known as Atman Foundation, was a new religious movement active mainly on the island of Tenerife in the Canary Islands and in Germany and is best known for a police and media scare in which an alleged attempt to commit ritual suicide took place in Teide National Park in Tenerife in 1998.

Apparently, the 32 members of the sect believed that they would be collected by a spacecraft and taken to an unspecified destination. Failing that, they were believed to be going to commit suicide. However, more recent articles in Tenerife News and Diario de Avisos question this, saying there was no intention to commit suicide by the group.

The Spanish media referred to the group as "secta de Heide Fittkau", after the name of its founder.

History 
It was founded by a German psychologist, Heide Fittkau-Garthe, who, on August 15, 1994, sold all her assets and moved to Tenerife.

On January 8, 1998, Fittkau-Garthe was alleged to have attempted suicide with her followers in Teide National Park, resulting in a police raid on the premises that the sect had in Santa Cruz de Tenerife.

According to Spanish and German police, the group was going to perform a sacrifice similar to that performed by the Order of the Solar Temple on October 4, 1994, in Cheiry and Salvan, two villages in Switzerland. It was later clarified that the Atman Foundation had nothing to do with the Solar Temple. Just three years later in 1997, the Heaven's Gate sect also committed a ritual suicide in San Diego, California. These events may have alerted the police about the Heide sect.

The group was thought to be planning to drink fruit juice laced with poison, which was confiscated during the raid. On analysis, the fruit juice was found not to contain any poison. In Germany all charges were eventually dropped in against members of the group due to lack of evidence, although the accusation still remained in Spain as of 2004 with no trial scheduled. The acquittal of Fittkau-Garthe in Spain received almost no attention in the news.

When interviewed by a local daily newspaper, Fittkau-Garthe made the following statement, "The group was no sect and I have never worked in one. I was accused of planning the suicide of a group of friends who had merely come over to spend Christmas in Tenerife. What actually happened in 1998 was the result of an act of a daughter's vengeance on her mother who was one of the group. Six months before they had had an enormous family row and it was the daughter who contacted Interpol and told them her mother and another hundred people were in the mountains of Tenerife intending to commit mass suicide. The daughter, she said, had informed the authorities that the group was a destructive sect. What happened was terrible. And the worst of it all were the lies that were told concerning children."

Beliefs 
According to Angela Gabriela a former member of the sect, the highlight of the ritual was the "love ring". This practice consisted of huge orgies, even between members of the same family. But this has been refuted by every other member as well as independent observers and journalists.

See also 
 Doomsday cult

References 

Apocalyptic groups
UFO religions
Hindu new religious movements
Organisations based in the Canary Islands
Religion in the Canary Islands